Kitao (written: 北尾) is a Japanese surname. Notable people with the surname include:

Kanako Kitao (born 1982), Japanese-American synchronized swimmer
, Japanese sumo wrestler and professional wrestler
, Japanese shogi player
, Japanese animator
, Japanese economist
, Japanese ukiyo-e artist
, Japanese fencer

See also
7954 Kitao, a main-belt asteroid

Japanese-language surnames